Shin Sun-nam may refer to:

 Nikolai Shin (1928–2006), Uzbekistani painter of Korean descent
 Shin Sun-nam (footballer) (born 1981), South Korean footballer